The Jeneberang (Historical Name : Garassi River) is a river of approximately 75 km in length in the south-western half of the island of Sulawesi, Indonesia. The catchment has an area of 760 square kilometers.

Hydrology 

The river rises near the 2833 meter high mountain Mount Bawakaraeng and runs through the districts of Gowa and Takalar up to the port city of Makassar, flowing into the Makassar Strait. Its final stretch physically separates the kelurahan of Barombong to the south from the rest of the city to the north. The river has flooded the city regularly, notably in 1976.

Approximately 40 km downstream is located is the 73 metre high Bili-Bili Dam, completed in 1999 with an internal volume of 380 million cubic meters.

On 26 March 2004 a landslide occurred in the upper reaches of the Jeneberang, killing 32 people. On 22 January 2019, the river overflowed due to heavy rain, causing a flood that killed dozens.

Geography
The river flows in the southwest area of Sulawesi with predominantly tropical monsoon climate (designated as Am in the Köppen-Geiger climate classification). The annual average temperature in the area is 25 °C. The warmest month is October, when the average temperature is around 28 °C, and the coldest is February, at 22 °C. The average annual rainfall is 2750 mm. The wettest month is January, with an average of 671 mm rainfall, and the driest is September, with 10 mm rainfall.

See also
List of rivers of Indonesia
List of rivers of Sulawesi

References

External links 
  Wilayah Administrasi BBWS Pompengan Jeneberang 
  Geologi DAS Jeneberang
 *

Rivers of South Sulawesi
Rivers of Indonesia